Yekusiel Yehuda (Zalmen Leib) Teitelbaum (1911 – 18 May 1944) was Chief Rabbi of Sighet/Máramarossziget from 1936–1940 (Romania), 1940–1944 (Hungary).

Biography
Teitelbaum was the eldest son of Rabbi Chaim Tzvi Teitelbaum (Atzei Chaim – d. 1926) and a brother of Rabbi Moshe Teitelbaum. He was born in Máramarossziget, Hungary in 1911. At the age of 14 he was a successor to a long chain of Uhel-Sziget Rebbe's.

In his first marriage, he married Ruchel, daughter of his uncle Rabbi Joel Teitelbaum. Ruchel died after 18 months of marriage and Teitelbaum remarried Gitel Yehudis, the daughter of his other uncle Rabbi Zusha Halberstam son of Rabbi Shalom Eliezer Halberstam of Újfehértó (Ratzfert).

The Holocaust
In May 1944, he was sent along with the first of four transports of the Jewish Community in Máramarossziget to the Auschwitz concentration camp where he was murdered in the early morning hours of May 18 in the gas chambers, together with his wife and his two children Chaim Tzvi and Ruchel.

Further reading
In 2004 Yad Yekusiel was published by Joel Rubin about Teitelbaum's life, as well of some of the responsa that were left from him after the Holocaust.

External links
Wiesenthal Center Biography 
Find A Grave *

1911 births
1944 deaths
People from Sighetu Marmației
Hasidic rabbis in Europe
Hungarian Orthodox rabbis
Hungarian civilians killed in World War II
Hungarian people who died in Auschwitz concentration camp
People killed by gas chamber by Nazi Germany
Hungarian Jews who died in the Holocaust
Teitelbaum family
Romanian Orthodox rabbis